Conservation Reserves are the legally protected areas which act as a buffer zone or connectors or migratory corridors  between two ecologically separated wildlife habitats to avoid fragmentation. The wildlife conserves are declared by the state government in official gazette. The state government after consultation with the local communities can declare any land adjacent to National Park or sanctuaries or linking two protected areas  which is owned by the government as conservation reserve  under the section 36A of The Wildlife Protection Act, 1972.

Gujarat
Chari-Dhand Wetland Conservation Reserve

Hariyana
Bir Bara Ban
Saraswati Plantation

HimachalPradesh
Darlaghat
Shili
Shri Naina Devi

Karnataka
Ankasamudra Birds
Banakapur
Basur Amrut Mahal Kaval
Bedthi
Hornbill
Jayamangali BlackBuck
Kolara Leaf Nosed Bat
Magadikere
Melapura Bee Eater Bird
Puttenahalli Lake Birds
Shalmale Riparian Biosystem
Thimalpura
Thungabhadra Otter
Ummanthur

Jammu & Kashmir
Achabal
Ajas
Bahu
Brain-Nishat
Chatlam Pampore Wetland
Freshkhori Wetland
Gambhir Mughlan Goral
Gharana Wetland
Hokera(Ramsar site) Wetland
Hygam Wetland
Jawahar Tunnel (Chakore Reserve)
Khanagund/Hajin
Kheri
Khimber/Dara/Sharazbal
Khonmoh
Khrew
Kranchoo Wetland
Kukarian Wetland
Kulian
Malgam Wetland
Manibaugh Wetland
Mirgund Wetland
Naganari
Nanga Wetland
Narkara Wetland
Pargwal Wetland
Sangral-Asachak Wetland
Shallabaugh Wetland
Sudhmahadev
Thein Wetland
Wangat/Chatrgul or Wangath
Zaloora Harwan

Ladakh
 Boodh Karbu
 Kanji
 Norrichain  wetland (tsokar)
 Sabu
 Tsomoriri Wetland

Lakshadweep
 A. Attakoya Thangal Marine reserve
 Dr. K. K. Mohammed Koya Sea Cucumber
 P.M. Sayeed Marine Birds Reserve

Maharashtra
 Anjaneri
 Borgad forest
 Kolamarka forest
 Mamdapur Conservation Reserve
 Muktai Bhavani
 Tilari forest
 Toranmal

Punjab
 Beas River
 Rakh Sarai Amanant Khan
 Ranjit Sagar
 Ropar wetland

Rajasthan
Bir Jhunjhunu
Bilaspur
Gogelao
Gudha Bisnoivan
Jawai Bandh Leopard
Jor Beed Gadwala Bikaner
Khetri Bansyal
Rotu
Shakambhari Sundhamata
Umedgaj Bird
Bansial Khetri Bagore
Mansa Mata

Sikkim
Sling Dong Fairreanum Orchid

Tamilnadu
Tiruppadaimarathur
Suchindram-Theroor-Managudi

Uttarakhand
Asan Wetland
Jhilmi Jheel
Naina Devi Himalayan Bird
Pawalgarh

West Bengal
Deul
Garpanchkot
Hijli
Mukutmanipur
Tekonia

References 

 
India
Conservation Reserves
Conservation Reserves